The Coupe de France 1974–75 was its 58th edition. It was won by AS Saint-Étienne which defeated RC Lens in the Final.

Round of 16

Quarter-finals

Semi-finals

Final

References

French federation

1974–75 domestic association football cups
1974-75
1974–75 in French football